The Vad is a left tributary of the river Someș in Romania. It discharges into the Someș in the village Vad.

References

Rivers of Romania
Rivers of Cluj County